The white-browed fantail (Rhipidura aureola) is a small passerine bird belonging to the family Rhipiduridae.

Description 

The adult white-browed fantail is about 18 cm long. It has dark brown upperparts, with white spots on the wings, and whitish underparts. The fan-shaped tail is edged in white, and the long white supercilia meet on the forehead. The throat and eyemask are blackish and border whitish moustachial stripes.

Distribution and habitat
The white-browed fantail breeds across tropical regions of the Indian Subcontinent and Southeast Asia. The species ranges from  eastern Pakistan to southern Indochina. It is found in forest and other woodland.

Behaviour and ecology
Three eggs are laid in a small cup nest in a tree. The white-browed fantail is insectivorous, and often fans its tail as it moves through the undergrowth.

Gallery

References 

 Birds of India by Grimmett, Inskipp and Inskipp, 

white-browed fantail
Birds of South Asia
Birds of Southeast Asia
white-browed fantail
Taxa named by René Lesson